Achille Mengé was a Belgian rower. He competed at the 1928 Summer Olympics in Amsterdam with the men's double sculls where they were eliminated in the round one repechage.

References

External links 
 
 

Year of birth missing
Year of death missing
Belgian male rowers
Olympic rowers of Belgium
Rowers at the 1928 Summer Olympics
European Rowing Championships medalists
20th-century Belgian people